Hibbertia brennanii is a species of flowering plant in the family Dilleniaceae and is endemic to the Arnhem Land escarpment. It is a low, spreading sub-shrub with hairy foliage, elliptic to lance-shaped leaves and pale yellow flowers arranged singly in leaf axils, with ten to twelve stamens arranged in groups around the two carpels.

Description
There are ten to twelve stamens arranged in groups around the two carpels, each carpel with two ovules. Flowering occurs from March to May.

Taxonomy
Hibbertia brennanii was first formally described in 2010 by Hellmut R. Toelken in the Journal of the Adelaide Botanic Gardens from specimens collected by Kym G. Brennan in Kakadu National Park in 1999. The specific epithet (brennanii) honours the collector of the type specimens.

Distribution and habitat
This hibbertia grows in rock crevices in heath on top of the Arnhem Land escarpment in the Northern Territory.

Conservation status
Goodenia brennanii is classified as "vulnerable" under the Northern Territory Government Territory Parks and Wildlife Conservation Act 1976 and is threatened by human activities and inappropriate fire regimes.

See also
List of Hibbertia species

References

brennanii
Flora of the Northern Territory
Plants described in 2010
Taxa named by Hellmut R. Toelken